The Battle of Mersa Matruh was fought from 26 to 29 June 1942, following the defeat of the Eighth Army (General Sir Claude Auchinleck) at the Battle of Gazala and was part of the Western Desert Campaign of the Second World War. The combatant on the Axis side was the Panzer Army Afrika ( ( Erwin Rommel), consisting of German and Italian units. The Allied forces of the Eighth Army comprised X Corps and XIII Corps. The battle developed as the  pursued the Eighth Army as it retreated into Egypt. Rommel intended to engage and destroy the Allied infantry formations in detail, before the British had a chance to regroup. The Axis cut off the line of retreat of X Corps and XIII Corps but was too weak to stop the British from breaking out. The fortress port of Mersa Matruh and 6,000 prisoners were captured, along with a great deal of supplies and equipment but the Eighth Army survived.

Background
After the defeat of the Eighth Army at Gazala, the Allied forces were compelled to retreat eastwards. The British left a garrison in Tobruk, which was expected to be strong enough to hold the port while the Eighth Army regrouped and replaced its losses. The British command had not prepared Tobruk for a lengthy siege and planned to return to relieve the Tobruk garrison within two months. The sudden Axis capture of Tobruk in a day came as a shock. The surrender of Tobruk was a great psychological blow to the British, it meant the Axis had a port to support an advance into Egypt and did not need to leave an investing force to watch the port.

After the victory at Tobruk, Rommel pressed on the heels of the retreating Eighth Army. Rommel intended to bring the Eighth Army to battle and defeat it, before the British had the chance to bring up fresh units and reform behind a defensive line. Though his forces were badly weakened by the Battle of Gazala, he had speed, guile and surprise. The 21st Panzer Division was given one day to regroup and then was sent down the coast road to Egypt. Fuel and ammunition supplies captured at Tobruk supplied the Axis forces for their drive to the frontier and beyond.

After the defeat at Gazala and the loss of Tobruk, Auchinleck offered his resignation on 22 June, which was declined. To slow the Axis advance into Egypt, the British command intended to form a defensive position at the Cyrenaica–Egypt frontier, along the Frontier Wire ("the wire"). XIII Corps (Lieutenant-General William Gott), was to fall back in a delaying action. Axis forces reached the wire on 23 June, shortly after the XIII Corps. There was no time to mount a defence and the Eighth Army lacked the armour to defend the open southern end of the position. Gott recommended falling back another  to the Mersa Matruh position. The British command ordered the Eighth Army to prepare to fight a decisive action at Mersa Matruh.

Rommel requested freedom of manoeuvre from Mussolini to pursue the Eighth Army into Egypt, which was granted. Additional fuel, equipment and munitions were salvaged from remaining British stores at the frontier. Rommel pushed on unopposed through the night and the next day, meeting no resistance from British forces on the ground but increasing attack from the air.

After the reverses at Gazala and Tobruk, the Eighth Army was disorganised and shaken but not demoralised. Auchinleck realised a change in command was necessary and on 25 June he relieved Ritchie, and assumed personal responsibility for the command of the Eighth Army. He issued directives to change the Eighth Army into a force that stressed mobility and made it clear that his highest priority was keeping the Eighth Army intact as a fighting force. The last defensive position before Alexandria was El Alamein. Auchinleck was preparing defences there but a mobile defensive battle was to be fought from Mersa Matruh to the El Alamein gap. It had become apparent to Auchinleck that non-mobile formations were helpless against mobile forces and he could ill afford to lose more formations. He shifted transport to enable the infantry formations with XIII Corps to be fully motorised and stressed that the Eighth Army forces fighting at Mersa Matruh must not allow themselves to be cut off.

Prelude

A railhead connected the town to Alexandria. The coastal town was like a small Tobruk. It had been fortified in 1940 before the Italian invasion of Egypt in 1940 and was further strengthened during the build-up for Operation Crusader. It was the last coastal fortress in Allied possession. The town is located on a thin coastal plain that extends inland  to an escarpment. Extending further south is a second narrow plain extending  to the Sidi Hamaza escarpment. At the eastern end of this escarpment is the  track. The western approach to the town was mined and these minefields had been extended around the southern approach to the town but the eastern approach to the fortress had not been mined. An airfield was just inland. The coast road  was the main avenue of retreat and ran through the town.

German plans

German planning for the battle was done when Rommel arrived. His general plan was to catch and defeat the Eighth Army in detail before the British had a chance to regroup behind a defensive line and rebuild their army with fresh formations. Having dealt their armoured forces a heavy blow at Gazala, he looked to destroy a major portion of their infantry formations by trapping them in the defensive fortress of Mersa Matruh. Rommel believed four Allied infantry divisions were in the fortress and the remnants of the British armour was to the south.

His drive into Egypt was hampered by the actions of the Desert Air Force. His own Luftwaffe had been outstripped by his rapid advance, and there was difficulty getting fighter aircraft up over his formations. Besides harassing his motor transport, the Desert Air Force had effected the loss of General Ettore Baldassarre, commander of the Italian XX Motorised Corps, who was mortally wounded by bomb fragments in an air attack 25 June while moving between his lead columns. Baldassare had been much valued by Rommel, who noted his bravery and efficiency.

 reconnaissance units reached the outskirts of Mersa Matruh on the evening of 25 June. Rommel planned to attack the next day, but on the morning of 26 June an Axis supply column was destroyed, causing a fuel shortage and delaying the attack till the afternoon. Rommel's information on Allied dispositions at Matruh was limited, partly due to a lack of reconnaissance flights and partly to the loss of his wireless interception unit, the 621st Signals Battalion, which the British had become aware of and made a point of over-running and destroying at the Battle of Gazala.

British plans
Auchinleck had been preparing defences at Mersa Matruh to be garrisoned by XXX Corps but then moved XXX Corps back to the Alamein position and its defensive positions at Matruh were taken up by X Corps (Lieutenant-General William Holmes), with two infantry divisions. The 10th Indian Infantry Division was positioned in Mersa Matruh proper, while the 50th (Northumbrian) Infantry Division was east of the town protecting the eastern approach. To the south, XIII Corps took up positions on the high ground above the second escarpment. Auchinleck directed the corps commanders to offer the strongest possible resistance and if either corps was attacked the other was to take the opportunity to attack the Axis flank.

XIII Corps comprised the 5th Indian Infantry Division, 2nd New Zealand Division and 1st Armoured Division but 5th Indian Infantry Division had only the 29th Indian Infantry Brigade. It was positioned south of the town on the Sidi Hamaza escarpment. The 2nd New Zealand Division was newly arrived from Syria. The 22nd Armoured Brigade (1st Armoured Division) was in the open desert  to the south-west. The division had been reinforced by the 7th Motorized Brigade and 4th Armoured Brigade (7th Armoured Division), which protected the Eighth Army against a flanking manoeuvre around the open southern desert. The armoured units had lost nearly all of their tanks at Gazala but had received replacements, bringing the number up to 159 tanks, including 60 American Grant tanks with  guns.

Between the corps was a plain bounded by the escarpments, where a thin minefield had been laid, screened by Gleecol and Leathercol from the 29th Indian Infantry Brigade. The small columns each had two platoons of infantry and an artillery detachment. Orders and counter-orders resulted in confusion in the minds of the Allied commanders. The Allied forces had to engage the Axis and inflict as much attrition as possible but could not risk being enveloped and destroyed. At Matruh the Eighth Army units were far stronger than the  pursuing them but Allied effectiveness was reduced by conflicting objectives. There was little co-ordination between the Allied forces and communication was poor from the corps level on down.

Battle

Delays in getting units in position and refuelled meant the Axis attack of 26 June did not begin until mid-afternoon. The 21st Panzer Division moved across the short plain between the two escarpments above Matruh, with 90th Light Division on its left flank, while 15th Panzer Division moved across the plain above the second escarpment with the Italian XX Motorized Corps following some ways behind. The 90th Light and 21st Panzer divisions made a path through the thin minefield and brushed aside Gleecol and Leathercol. On the high desert plain the 15th Panzer Division ran into the 22nd Armoured Brigade and its drive forward was checked.

As it moved east, the 90th Light Division came under the fire of 50th Infantry Division artillery and was forced to take cover. To the south Rommel advanced with the 21st Panzer Division and under the cover of an artillery duel the 21st Panzer Division made a flanking movement across the front of the 2nd New Zealand Division, to the eastern approach at Minqar Qaim. The division ran into the 2nd New Zealand divisional transport at Minquar Qaim, scattering it. Though the New Zealanders were easily holding against the 21st Panzer Division, their path of retreat had been cut off. At midday 27 June, Auchinleck sent a message to his two corps commanders indicating that if they were threatened with being cut off they were to retire rather than risk encirclement and destruction. Rommel moved north and joined the 90th Light Division. He got them to resume their advance, with the imperative to cut the coast road. After dark, the 90th Light Division reached the coast road and cut it, blocking the retreat of X Corps.

In light of 2nd New Zealand's path of retreat being cut off to the east, Gott made his decision to withdraw that night and notified the Eighth Army. In fact it was the  that was in a perilous position. The 90th Light was occupying a narrow salient, isolated on the coast road. The opportunity was not perceived, as the chief concern in the mind of the corps commander was getting his forces out intact.

At 21:20 hours on 27 June, Auchinleck ordered the Eighth Army to fall back to Fuka. By this point, 2nd New Zealand Division commander General Bernard Freyberg had been wounded in the neck from shrapnel. He passed command to Brigadier Lindsay Inglis the commander of the 4th NZ Brigade. Inglis chose to use his brigade to fight their way through to the east, to be followed by the divisional headquarters and the 5th NZ Brigade. There was to be no preliminary bombardment, as that would alert the Germans. The start of the attack was delayed until 02:00 by the late arrival of the Maori battalion. Once formed up the three battalions set off down the escarpment. With fixed bayonets, the 4th NZ Brigade drove down the  track directly upon the positions of a  battalion of the 21st Panzer Division. The German defenders were unaware of the New Zealand advance until they were nearly upon them and the New Zealanders drove their way through the defensive positions of 21st Panzer Division.

The fighting was fierce, confused, at times hand to hand and some German wounded were bayoneted by the New Zealanders as they worked their way through, for which the  command issued a formal complaint. Reaching the other side of the position, 4th NZ Brigade regrouped and made good their escape to the east. While this attack was underway Inglis grew concerned over the delay and the approaching dawn, deciding to take the rest of the division by a different route. Overloading what transport was available he led the Divisional Headquarters, the Reserve Group and the 5th NZ Brigade away to the south and ran into the positions of a panzer battalion of the 21st Panzer Division. In the confused firing that followed a number of trucks and ambulance vehicles were set on fire but the bulk of the force managed to scramble away. Orders had been issued for a withdrawal of XIII Corps to Fuka but it is unclear if the 2nd New Zealand Division received them. The elements of the division continued east to El Alamein. Over the three days of fighting the New Zealanders had suffered some 800 casualties, including their commanding officer but almost 10,000 New Zealanders got away.

Due to a communication error, Auchinleck's order to withdraw did not reach Holmes until early in the morning of 28 June. Through the night, X Corps counter-attacked to the south to take the pressure off Gott, not realising that XIII Corps had already gone. A short discussion was held between Holmes and Auchinleck, in which Holmes decided that he could remain and hold on to the fortress as long as possible, attack eastwards on the coast road and fight through the 90th Light Division or break out in the night to the south. Auchinleck made it clear that X Corps was not to attempt to hold out in its defensive positions and he thought there was no point to try to fight east along the coast road. He ordered Holmes to divide his force into columns and break out to the south. They were to continue on for a few miles before turning east to make their way to El Alamein.

That night X Corps assembled in small columns and broke out to the south. The  had moved on, leaving only the Italians and the 90th Light Division to invest Matruh. Fierce engagements primarily with Italian forces occurred as they drove through. One of the columns picked a path that approached the  command section. Rommel's  was engaged, and the staff officers themselves had to take up arms. After a time Rommel moved his headquarters south and away from the fighting.

The 29th Indian Infantry Brigade arrived at the regrouping point at Fuka late in the afternoon of 28 June. Arriving soon after was the 21st Panzer Division. The commander of the brigade had assembled transport in case a quick withdrawal was necessary but the assault of 21st Panzer came too rapidly and the brigade was overrun and destroyed. Early on the morning of 29 June, the 90th Light Division and Italian 133rd Armoured Division "Littorio" encircled Mersah Matruh. The 10th Indian Division tried to break out on the night of 28 June but was repulsed by "Littorio". The Mersa Matruh positions had been bombarded by the artillery of the 27th Infantry Division "Brescia" and 102nd Motorised Division "Trento", which along with the 90th Light Division represented the main force invested in the stronghold and after some time of infantry fighting and failed break-out attempts, the stronghold sought to capitulate. On June 29, the 7th Bersaglieri Regiment entered the stronghold and accepted the surrender of 6,000 Allied troops while capturing a great deal of supplies and equipment.

The 90th Light Division was allowed no time to rest, but was quickly sent down the coast road after the retreating Eighth Army. An entry in the 90th Light War Diary rued "After all our days of hard fighting, we did not get a chance to rest or bathe in the ocean". The 21st Panzer Division intercepted some British columns near Fuka and took another 1,600 prisoners. Small columns from both sides raced across the broken ground of the desert toward El Alamein. Units became intermingled and disorganised and opposing columns ran parallel to each other, with German columns sometimes running in front of the retreating British. The columns sometimes exchanged fire and as about 85 per cent of the  transport was captured British or American equipment, it was often difficult to distinguish friend from foe.

Aftermath

The fight at Matruh took its character from the disposition of the Eighth Army forces, Rommel's misunderstanding of them, and the chronic lack of co-ordination between British infantry and armoured units. After the war Field Marshal Henry Maitland Wilson said "The XIII Corps just disappeared and left X Corps up the pole". Holmes estimated that only 60 per cent of X Corps got back to El Alamein. Friedrich von Mellenthin, Rommel's intelligence officer during the battle, commented "As a result of Auchinleck’s hesitation, the British not only lost a great opportunity of destroying the  but suffered a serious defeat, which might easily have turned into an irretrievable disaster. I stress this point, for to the student of generalship there are few battles so instructive as Mersa Matruh".

Following its escape from Matruh the surviving units of X Corps were scattered and badly disorganised. It was withdrawn to the Nile as "Delta Force" and was unable to participate in the early phases of the First Battle of El Alamein. The 2nd New Zealand Division did not regroup at Fuka but continued to El Alamein. The New Zealanders were placed into the El Alamein line. Some 8,000 Allied prisoners were taken during the battle, 6,000 at Matruh, where forty British tanks were also lost. Large supply dumps were captured by the Axis as well and enough equipment for a division.

With the fall of Matruh, Axis aircraft operating from the Matruh airfields would be  from the naval base at Alexandria. In light of this threat the British naval command withdrew the Mediterranean Fleet, dispersing its force to several smaller eastern Mediterranean ports. Panic was in the air in Alexandria and Cairo. The head of the US Army Intelligence Division predicted the British position in Egypt would collapse in less than a week. People fled east to Palestine and the air was thick with the smoke of burning official and secret documents. The British consulate was swamped with people requesting visas. The British army flooded sections of the Nile Delta, prepared to demolish infrastructure and built up defensive positions at Alexandria and the Suez canal. A scorched earth policy was discussed but decided against.

Mellenthin wrote, "Rommel may have been lucky, but Mersa Matruh was certainly a brilliant German victory and gave us great hopes of 'bouncing' the Eighth Army out of the Alamein line". In the event Auchinleck rallied the Eighth Army and in a month of battle checked the German advance at the First Battle of El Alamein. After it was over both sides were exhausted but the British still held their positions.

The Allied crisis passed and the Eighth Army began to build up its strength in preparation for going back onto the offensive. The battle also functioned as a large morale-booster for Rommel's Italian troops, as it had been predominantly executed by them, albeit under German command.

Notes

See also 

 List of British military equipment of World War II
 List of German military equipment of World War II
 List of Italian military equipment in World War II

Footnotes

Bibliography

Further reading

External links
 Painting: The breakthrough, Minqar Qa'im, 27–28 June 1942 (Peter McIntyre)

Conflicts in 1942
1942 in Libya
Western Desert campaign
Libya in World War II
Battles of World War II involving the United Kingdom
Battles and operations of World War II involving South Africa
Battles and operations of World War II involving India
Battles of World War II involving Italy
Battles of World War II involving New Zealand
Battles of World War II involving Germany
Erwin Rommel
June 1942 events